The Weiss Manfréd Acél- és Fémművek ("Manfréd Weiss Steel and Metal Works"), or colloquially Csepel Művek ("Csepel Works") was one of the largest machine factories in Hungary, located on Csepel island in the southern part of Budapest, founded in 1897. It was the second largest industrial enterprise in the Austro-Hungarian Monarchy, and the biggest industrial enterprise in the Hungarian half of the Empire. It played an integral role in the heavy industry and military production of the Austro-Hungarian Monarchy. Founded by Baron Manfréd Weiss of Csepel, an industrialist of Jewish origin, by the time of World War I the company was one of largest defense contractors in Austria-Hungary, producing all types of equipment, from airplanes and munitions to automotive engines, bicycles Csepel bicycle and cars. Badly damaged by Allied air raids and eventually pillaged during World War II, the company continued in existence until 1950, when it was nationalised and renamed to Rákosi Mátyás Vas- és Fémművek ("Mátyás Rákosi Iron and Metal Works NV", where "NV" means Nemzeti Vállalat, "National Company").

History 
In the late 19th century, the company, then owned exclusively by Manfréd Weiss, expanded into production of ammunition for the Austro-Hungarian Army and Navy. The new factory produced all types, from small arms to artillery shells.

In 1892, production begins at the infantry ammunition factory built within the Weiss Manfréd factory in Csepel, where 8 mm Mannlicher rifle cartridges are initially produced for the Hungarian Royal Defence Forces and the Austro-Hungarian Joint Army. From 1893, millions of 7.62×54 mm R-calibre Moszin-Nagant rifle cartridges were produced for the Russian Tsarist army between 1893-94. Then the production of artillery shells of various sizes begins. 

Thus, Manfréd Weiss became one of the principal defence contractors for the Hungarian part of the empire, his main competitor being the state-owned steel mill in Diósgyőr, the Diósgyőr-Vasgyár. In 1906, the company was supported by Hungarian Society of Industrialists, who lobbied for a new law that would allow state-owned companies to produce only products unobtainable from private companies. With such support, the Manfréd Weiss Works soon emerged as the largest firm on the market.

Another boost in company's history came in 1911, when Austria-Hungary significantly expanded its military budget. The public orders allowed the company to quickly expand ammunition production and establish additional factories: new steel and iron furnaces, and new copper, nickel, and aluminium installations. Production capacity was growing and soon the firm became one of the principal sources of ammunition for the armies of the Kingdom of Serbia, Kingdom of Bulgaria, Portugal, Spain, Mexico, and the Russian Empire. By 1913, the Manfréd Weiss Works employed over 5000 workers.

During World War I, the workforce exceeded 30,000. For his services to the Austro-Hungarian state, Weiss was ennobled, becoming Manfréd, Baron Weiss de Csepel, after the main seat of operations of his company. In the beginning of the WW1, the WM complex had 250 hectare territory with 216 factory buildings.

By the outbreak of World War II, the company had become a modern industrial conglomerate, with over 40,000 employees; its management remained largely composed of Hungarian Jews. When Nazi Germany overran Hungary in 1944, the majority were arrested by the Gestapo. The Weiss family was allowed to emigrate to Portugal and escape the horrors of the Holocaust, but their large art collection, along with the entire industrial complex bearing their name, was taken over by Germany. However, as Germany insisted Hungary was still a sovereign nation, the owners of the company received large compensation and remained official owners, with the German-imposed management merely a trusteeship for a period of 25 years. Eventually, control over the company was given to the Nazi SS, with a completely new holding company's management, with officers including Erhard Milch, Kurt Baron von Schröder, and Hans Jüttner.

Weiss Manfréd aircraft 
Weiss Manfréd WM-10 Ölyv
Weiss Manfréd WM-16 Budapest
Weiss Manfréd WM-21 Sólyom
Weiss Manfréd WM-23 Ezüst Nyíl

References

Citations

Bibliography 

 
 

Defunct motor vehicle manufacturers of Hungary
Manufacturing companies based in Budapest
Hungarian brands
Defunct aircraft manufacturers of Hungary
Metal companies of Hungary
Csepel
Automotive companies of Hungary
Defunct rolling stock manufacturers of Hungary
Companies of Austria-Hungary
Defunct manufacturing companies of Hungary
1897 establishments in Austria-Hungary
1950 disestablishments in Hungary
Vehicle manufacturing companies disestablished in 1950